Rugby League is one of the most popular codes of football in the Australian Capital Territory. The Canberra Raiders of the National Rugby League became the Territory's first professional sports team when they were established in 1982. For decades before that rugby league clubs in the area had been competing and providing footballers for representative sides that played against domestic and foreign teams.

Governing body

The New South Wales Rugby League (NSWRL) is the governing body for the sport of rugby league in New South Wales and the Australian Capital Territory.

National Rugby League Teams

The National Rugby League (NRL) is Australia's top-level competition for the sport of rugby league.

The Canberra Raiders are Canberra's National Rugby League team, being admitted to the competition in 1982.

Canberra Rugby League

The Canberra Rugby League competition is more commonly known as the Canberra Raiders Cup, covering the Australian Capital Territory and surrounding New South Wales towns Queanbeyan, Goulburn and Yass. The competition is run under the auspices of the Country Rugby League and players are eligible for selection in the Monaro Division of the CRL Divisional Championships.

Representative rugby league

ACT players are eligible to represent Country in the NSWRL City vs Country Origin in an annual match against a City side selected by the NSWRL. It is played before the Rugby League State of Origin series and is often referred to as a selection trial for the New South Wales Blues team.

They can also go onto play for New South Wales Blues in the State of Origin series against Queensland Maroons.

An Australian Capital Territories representative side took part in the early Affiliated States Championship.

See also

 Rugby league in Australia
 Rugby league in New South Wales
 Sport in the Australian Capital Territory

External links
 Official New South Wales Rugby League Site
 Rugby league clubs in ACT and surrounding area

References

Rugby league in Australia
Australian Capital Territory